The 2022–23 season of the Heroes Den Bosch is the 71st season of the Heroes Den Bosch, and its 2nd in the BNXT League.

Heroes will make its debut in the qualifying rounds of the Basketball Champions League.

Roster

Transcations

Extensions

In 

|}

Out

|}

References

Heroes Den Bosch
Heroes Den Bosch seasons
2022–23 Basketball Champions League